Aung Aung Oo (born 8 June 1980
) is a burmese retired professional footballer who plays as goalkeeper. He made his first appearance for the Myanmar national football team in 1999.

References 

1980 births
Living people
Burmese footballers
Myanmar international footballers
Association football goalkeepers